Saint-Pierre-des-Corps station is a railway station serving the town of Saint-Pierre-des-Corps and the Tours agglomeration, Indre-et-Loire department, western France. It is situated on the Paris–Bordeaux railway and the Tours–Saint-Nazaire railway.

History
Given its strategic position on the Loire, the entire Tours / Saint-Pierre-des-Corps railway complex was the target of bombing during the Second World War. In 1990 the passenger building, which by then no longer existed, was rebuilt following the opening of the LGV Atlantique, to accommodate TGV and Aqualys from 2001. This latter service is still provided, but was re-marketed as the Intercités brand.

In 2018, SNCF estimated annual usage of this station is 3,457,033 passengers and if non-passengers are included it rises to 4,321,292.

Passenger services

Reception
The SNCF station has a passenger building, with ticket offices, open every day. It is equipped with automatic machines for the purchase of tickets.

Services
Saint-Pierre-des-Corps is served by TGV and Ouigo, Intercités, Interloire, Rémi Express, TER Auvergne-Rhône-Alpes, Aléop (formerly TER Pays de la Loire trains) and rail shuttles between Tours and Saint-Pierre-des-Corps. However, the waiting room is located on the central and main platform, which makes it necessary to leave the station and to enter it.

The following services currently call at Saint-Pierre-des-Corps:
high speed services (TGV) Paris - Bordeaux
intercity services (Intercités) Nantes - Saint-Pierre-des-Corps - Bourges - Lyon
regional services (TER Centre-Val de Loire) Tours - Blois - Orléans
regional services (TER Centre-Val de Loire) Tours - Gièvres - Vierzon
regional services (TER Centre-Val de Loire) Nantes - Angers - Tours - Blois - Orléans

Other services
A park for bikes and parking for vehicles are provided.

Freight traffic
Until 2007 the station also included a marshalling yard, on a large site that extended all the way to the neighbouring commune of La Ville-aux-Dames. This station is open to freight service.

See also 

 List of SNCF stations in Centre-Val de Loire

References

External links

 

Railway stations in Indre-et-Loire
TER Centre-Val de Loire
Railway stations in France opened in 1846